Nizyanka is a rural locality (a settlement) in Basakinskoye Rural Settlement, Chernyshkovsky District, Volgograd Oblast, Russia. The population was 30 as of 2010. There are 3 streets.

Geography 
Nizyanka is located on the Don plain, 58 km southwest of Chernyshkovsky (the district's administrative centre) by road. Rossoshansky is the nearest rural locality.

References 

Rural localities in Chernyshkovsky District